Roskilde Ring was a motor racing circuit in Roskilde, Denmark. It hosted the Danish Grand Prix between 1960 and 1962, with non-championship Formula One races in the last two years which were won by Stirling Moss and Jack Brabham.

History
The circuit was opened in 1955 by Businessman Paul Tholstrup as a short  track, becoming Denmark's first permanent road circuit. The layout was a banked oval, utilizing the steep sides of the old gravel pit which the circuit was built on. In 1957 the track was extended, using waste land which existed between the circuit and the rail track to the west. This created the still relatively short  grand prix circuit. Typical for this circuit, described by Stirling Moss as "a most peculiar raceway", were the banked corners and the fact that the circuit did not have a real straight. Because the track was built in an old gravel pit it looks like an amphitheater.

The Roskilde Ring was located close to the center of Roskilde, with new residential developments surrounding the circuit. The last race on the track was Scalextric-Löbet, which was held in 22 September 1968. Due to the high number of complaints about the noise created, it was closed in 14 April 1969. After closing the site was turned into a park. A hotel has been built where the race control tower stood.

Lap records

The official race lap records at the Roskilde Ring are listed as:

Notes

References

External links 
Roskilde Ring at the racing line

Motorsport venues in Denmark
Danish Grand Prix
Sport in Roskilde
Defunct motorsport venues
Sports venues completed in 1955
1955 establishments in Denmark
1969 disestablishments in Denmark